Saitis kandyensis is a species of spider of the genus Saitis. It is endemic to Sri Lanka.

References

kandyensis
Endemic fauna of Sri Lanka
Spiders of Asia
Spiders described in 2013